The Antelope Valley of southern Eureka County is a small 35 mi (56 km) long valley, surrounded by four mountain ranges. Antelope Wash flows north, to endorheic flatlands at the valley's north end.  Eureka, Nevada lies 20 mi east nestled among mountain ranges.  From Eureka U.S. Route 50 travels west through the north end of the valley on a route to Austin.

Description
The southeast portion is within the Toiyabe National Forest.

Antelope Valley begins as Antelope Wash in northern Nye County between the Monitor Range and the Antelope Range. Thereafter Antelope Valley merges with the Monitor Valley from the west and the Kobeh Valley from the north to become a broad basin between the Monitor and Simpson Park ranges to the west, Roberts Mountains to the north and the Antelope, Fish Creek and Mountain Boy ranges to the southeast.

The isolated Lone Mountain within the southeastern portion of the valley separates Antelope and Kobeh valleys. This is about 1900 feet above the valley floor.

Stream drainage from Antelope Wash and from a number of streams from the Roberts Mountains merge to the southwest of Lone Mountain to form Slough Creek which flows to the east to disappear in Hay Meadow just to the southeast of Lone Mountain making the combined valley an endorheic system.

References

Valleys of Nevada
Valleys of Eureka County, Nevada